Audrey Marie Cleary (née Boucher; June 1, 1930 – February 5, 2019) was a Democratic-NPL politician who represented District 49 in the North Dakota House of Representatives from 1991 to 1997 and from 1999 to 2003.

Biography
Audrey Marie Boucher was born in Menominee, Michigan in 1930. She graduated from the Marquette University College of Nursing in 1952 and worked as a labor and delivery nurse for several years. In 1954, she married Joseph Cleary with whom she moved to Bismarck, North Dakota the next year. The Clearys raised eleven children in Bismarck.

After all her children had moved out, Audrey Cleary, a longtime supporter of the Democratic–NPL Party, ran for her local seat in the North Dakota State House of Representatives. She won her election and served in the 1991–1992 legislative session alongside Republicans Bob and Jon Martinson. In 2004, after North Dakota legislative district lines were redrawn, she was defeated in the new District 35 by Republican opponent Margaret Sitte.

Audrey Boucher died in Bismarck on February 7, 2019, aged 88.

References

External links
Audrey B. Cleary official Legislative Assembly biography

1930 births
2019 deaths
20th-century American politicians
20th-century American women politicians
21st-century American politicians
21st-century American women politicians
Marquette University alumni
Women state legislators in North Dakota
People from Menominee, Michigan
Politicians from Bismarck, North Dakota
American women nurses
Democratic Party members of the North Dakota House of Representatives